Carex thunbergii is a tussock-forming species of perennial sedge in the family Cyperaceae. It is native to parts of eastern Asia from around Manchuria in the west to Japan in the east. It is found in Primorye to the north to Korea in the south.

The sedge has a rhizome producing long runners. The smooth culms can have a rough texture toward the top and are surrounded at the base by sheaths with a light brown colour that fall apart into a fibrous mass with age.

The species was first described by the botanist Ernst Gottlieb von Steudel in 1446 as a part of the journal Flora. It has six synonyms; Carex gaudichaudiana var. thunbergii, Carex brachysandra, Carex koidzumiana, Carex thunbergii var. brachysandra, Carex thunbergii var. platycarpa and Carex thunbergii var. quinquenervis.

See also
List of Carex species

References

thunbergii
Plants described in 1846
Taxa named by Ernst Gottlieb von Steudel
Flora of Japan
Flora of Korea
Flora of Primorsky Krai
Flora of Manchuria